Clovis Vincent was born September 26, 1879 in Ingré (Loiret) and died November 14, 1947 in Paris. He was a French neurologist and neurosurgeon. With Thierry de Martel (1875-1940), he was one of the founders of neurosurgery in France.

Career 
Student of Professor Fulgence Raymond, Charcot's successor, he had a great admiration for Joseph Babinski.
In 1914, when the First World War broke out, he served as a 2nd class Doctor adjutant in a stretcher bearers corps assigned to the 46th Infantry Regiment. In February 1915, he took part to the Battle of Vauquois (Meuse department, Lorraine, north-eastern France). He received the Legion of Honor as a soldier and the Military Medal in 1915.

He was appointed chief physician of the neurological center of the ninth French military region, located in the buildings of the Descartes high school in Tours. There, he fostered a new treatment to get soldiers with psychic disease symptomes back to the front. The soldiers suffering from shell-shock ("Obusite") underwent a "faradic treatment", more commonly known as "torpedoing": 60 mA to 100 mA electric shocks were inflicted to those with a plicature syndrome.

On May 27, 1916, at a session of "torpedoing", the Zouave Baptiste Deschamps hit Clovis Vincent. A sensational trial opened that the press described as follows: "Can a soldier refuse to be treated? ".

In 1927, he went to Boston to see Harvey Cushing, a pioneer in neurosurgery.

On 19 December 1937, in Paris, Clovis Vincent tried surgery on the brain of Maurice Ravel. The composer woke up a short time after surgery, and then plunged into a definitive coma.

References 

1879 births
1947 deaths
French neuroscientists
History of neuroscience
People from Loiret